Lubeluzole (Prosynap) is a drug which acts as an indirect NMDA antagonist. It inhibits the release of glutamate, inhibits nitric oxide synthesis, and blocks calcium and sodium gated ion channels. It has neuroprotective effects particularly in hypoxic conditions, and was developed for the treatment of stroke. Trials showed it to be safe, effective and well tolerated at low doses, but unfortunately higher doses produced the dangerous cardiac side effect of lengthening the QTc interval, which could potentially lead to heart failure, and so this meant that subsequent trials were limited to using only the low dose range. Animal studies had shown lubeluzole to produce neuroprotective effects when administered for prolonged periods, but the aim of its developers was to produce a drug that would be effective for preventing damage from acute stroke, and so ultimately it failed to show sufficient efficacy in trials and development for medical use was halted.

References 

NMDA receptor antagonists
Fluoroarenes
Phenol ethers
Secondary alcohols
Piperidines
Benzothiazoles